is a passenger railway station in the town of Kudoyama, Ito District, Wakayama Prefecture, Japan, operated by the private railway company Nankai Electric Railway.

Lines
Shimo-Kosawa Station is served by the Nankai Kōya Line, and is located 55.9 kilometers from the terminus of the line at Shiomibashi Station and 55.2 kilometers from Namba Station.

Station layout
The station consists of two opposed side platforms connected to the station building by a level crossing. The station is staffed.

Platforms

Adjacent stations

History
Shimo-Kosawa Station opened on June 18, 1928. The Nankai Railway was merged into the Kintetsu group in 1944 by orders of the Japanese government, and reemerged as the Nankai Railway Company in 1947.

Passenger statistics
In fiscal 2019, the station was used by an average of 25 passengers daily (boarding passengers only).

Surrounding area
 Japan National Route 370

See also
List of railway stations in Japan

References

External links

 Shimo-Kosawa Station Official Site

Railway stations in Japan opened in 1928
Railway stations in Wakayama Prefecture
Kudoyama, Wakayama